Sailly-le-Sec is a commune in the Somme department in Hauts-de-France in northern France.

Geography

Population

History
21 April 1918 - Manfred Von Richthofen, The Red Baron, was finally shot down here.

On the night of August 8–9, 1918, as three Battalions of Doughboys from the 33rd U.S. Infantry Division were joining the Allied offensive during the Battle of Amiens, American war poet Lieut. John Allan Wyeth and Lieut. Thomas J. Cochrane were assigned to deliver sealed orders from Division HQ at Molliens-au-Bois to the Field Headquarters of all three Battalions engaged in the attack. The location of each Battalion was unknown, but they were believed to be along the northern bank of the Somme River, near the village of Sailly-le-Sec. Wyeth would later describe the mission in detail in his six interlinked Chipilly Ridge sonnets.

See also
Communes of the Somme department

References

Communes of Somme (department)